Sue Pann Khwai Thwe Bayet Hnint Pay Ywat Leik Nahtaung Sin is a 2020 Myanmar drama television series. It aired on MRTV-4, from February 13 to April 13, 2020, on Mondays to Fridays at 19:00 for 43 episodes.

Cast

Main
 Khant Sithu as Kyar Swal
 Aung Yay Chan as Myo Thwin
 Khine Thin Kyi as Pone Yay
 Htun Eaindra Bo as Ma Kyay Myin

Supporting
 Aye Aye Khaing as Kyar Au
 Myo Myo Khaing as Hla Ohn Mal
 Aye Thidar as Ma Sein
 Aung Khaing as Ko Ba Aung
 War War Aung as Ma Mya War
 Phone Sett Thwin as Mya Thaung
 Shwe Sin Wint Shein as Shwe Yi
 Great Chan as Taing Khin
 Htet Myat as Phone Soe
 Kahtay Phone Thaw as Aww Bar
 Ei Ei Chun as Shwe Au
 Shwe Ao as a monk
 Kaung San as Ko Kwat
 Khin Soe Paing as Daw Kyay Kyoke
 Nga Pyaw Kyaw as Than Chaung
 Nay Htun as U Pann Hsi

References

Burmese television series
MRTV (TV network) original programming